Jorde is a surname. Notable people with the surname include:

 Lars Jorde (1865–1939), Norwegian painter and illustrator
 Lynn Jorde, American human geneticist
  (born 1964), Danish actor

See also
 Jorden